Davide Garbolino (born 24 September 1968 in Cirié) is an Italian voice actor, dubbing director, and television presenter. Garbolino contributes to voicing characters in anime, cartoons, live action and videogame content.

He is well known for providing the voice of the protagonist Ash Ketchum in the Italian-language version of the anime series Pokémon, Michelangelo in the first three series of Teenage Mutant Ninja Turtles, Plucky Duck and Young Donald Duck in the Italian dubs of Tiny Toon Adventures and DuckTales (2017 TV series), respectively, and Nobita in Doraemon. He is also the current Italian voice of Bugs Bunny since 2007, replacing Massimo Giuliani.

He works at Merak Film, Studio Asci, Raflesia, ADC Group, Studio P.V. and other dubbing studios in Italy.

Voice Work

Anime and animation
 Konkichi in Dragon Ball 
 Gohan (older) in Dragon Ball Z
 Gohan in Dragon Ball GT
 Gohan in Dragon Ball Z: Return of Cooler (Second dub)
 Gohan in Dragon Ball Z: Wrath of the Dragon (Second dub)
 Gohan in Dragon Ball Super
 Ash Ketchum  in Pokémon
 Ash Ketchum in Pokémon: The First Movie
 Ash Ketchum in Pokémon: The Movie 2000
 Ash Ketchum in Pokémon 3: The Movie
 Ash Ketchum in Pokémon 4Ever
 Ash Ketchum in Pokémon Heroes
 Ash Ketchum in Pokémon: Jirachi Wish Maker
 Ash Ketchum in Pokémon: Destiny Deoxys
 Ash Ketchum in Pokémon: Lucario and the Mystery of Mew
 Ash Ketchum in Pokémon Ranger and the Temple of the Sea
 Ash Ketchum in Pokémon: The Rise of Darkrai
 Ash Ketchum in Pokémon: Giratina and the Sky Warrior
 Ash Ketchum in Pokémon: Arceus and the Jewel of Life
 Ash Ketchum in Pokémon: Zoroark: Master of Illusions
 Ash Ketchum in Pokémon the Movie: Black—Victini and Reshiram and White—Victini and Zekrom
 Ash Ketchum in Pokémon the Movie: Kyurem vs. the Sword of Justice
Ash Katchum in Pokémon the Movie: Genesect and the Legend Awakened
Ash Ketchum in Pokémon the Movie: Diancie and the Cocoon of Destruction
Ash Ketchum in Pokémon the Movie: Hoopa and the Clash of Ages
Ash Ketchum in Pokémon the Movie: Volcanion and the Mechanical Marvel
Ash Ketchum in Pokémon the Movie: I Choose You!
Ash Ketchum in Pokémon the Movie: The Power of Us
 Jared in Pokémon Chronicles
 Ryou Shirogane in Tokyo Mew Mew
 Daniel Witwicky in Transformers
 Cancer in Transformers: Super-God Masterforce
 Blurr in Transformers Animated
 Raf Esquivel in Transformers: Prime
 Dick Grayson/Robin in Batman: The Animated Series
 Tim Drake/Robin in The New Batman Adventures
 Dick Grayson/Robin in The Batman
 Syrus Truesdale in Yu-Gi-Oh! GX
 Lester in Yu-Gi-Oh! 5D's
 Reginald Kastle in Yu-Gi-Oh! Zexal
 Nobita Nobi in Doraemon (1979 anime) (second dub)
 Nobita Nobi in Doraemon: Nobita in Dorabian Nights 
 Nobita Nobi in Doraemon: Nobita and the Kingdom of Clouds   
Miki Kaoru in Revolutionary Girl Utena
 Omi in Xiaolin Showdown
 Tucker Foley in Danny Phantom
 Yonkuro Hinomaru in Dash! Yonkuro
 Dewey in Nurse Angel Ririka SOS
 Alden Jones in Braceface
 Bert Raccoon in The Raccoons
 Connor in Cubix
 Digit in Cyberchase
 Junior in Hairy Scary
 Dine in The Twisted Whiskers Show
 Josh in Creepschool
 Dilton Doiley in Archie's Weird Mysteries
 Fuyuki Takeichi in School Rumble
 Tommy Cadle and Clinton Fillmore Jefferson XIII in Pet Alien
 Baron Letloy in Bakugan Battle Brawlers: New Vestroia
 Lazlo in Camp Lazlo
 Rodney J. Squirrel in Squirrel Boy
 Plucky Duck in Tiny Toon Adventures
 Timothy Platypus  in Taz-Mania
 Andropov in Blue Dragon
 Yusuke Urameshi in YuYu Hakusho
 Tororo in Keroro Gunso
 Tak in Tak and the Power of Juju
 Matt Martin/Kewl Breeze in Zevo-3
 Manny Rivera/El Tigre in El Tigre: The Adventures of Manny Rivera
 Harvey Kinkle in Sabrina: The Animated Series
 Harvey Kinkle in Sabrina's Secret Life
 Idate Morino in Naruto
 Obito Uchiha in Naruto: Shippuden
 Jun Kawanakajima in Ultra Maniac
 Axel Blaze (First voice) in Inazuma Eleven
 Victor Blade in Inazuma Eleven GO
 Chivil in Dr. Slump (second dub, 1980/86 series)
 Jean Roque Raltique in Nadia: The Secret of Blue Water (First and second dubs)
 Fixit in PopPixie
 Kyōsuke Kasuga in Kimagure Orange Road (First dub)
 Michelangelo in Teenage Mutant Ninja Turtles (2003 TV series)
 Tsubute in Ninja Scroll: The Series
 Jimmy Two-Shoes in Jimmy Two-Shoes
 Petrie in The Land Before Time VII: The Stone of Cold Fire
 Hiroshi Naganuma in Mizuiro Jidai
 Kaoru Yamazaki in Welcome to the N.H.K.
 Keswick in T.U.F.F. Puppy
 Sora in Beyblade: Metal Fusion
 Blooter in Poppets Town
 Joshi in GoGoRiki
 Fixit in PopPixie
 Piggley Winks in Jakers! The Adventures of Piggley Winks
 Jay in Machine Robo Rescue
 Koza (Second voice) in One Piece
 Tobio in One Piece: The Movie
 Mobambi in Chopper's Kingdom on the Island of Strange Animals
 Touma in One Piece: Norowareta Seiken
 Alec/Alexander O. Howell in Ceres, Celestial Legend
 Handy in The Adventures of Chuck and Friends
 Bugs Bunny in The Looney Tunes Show
 Pablo DaVinci in The DaVincibles
 Shinobu Saruwatari in Godannar
 Shinichi Kudo in Detective Conan
 Shinichi Kudo in Detective Conan: The Time-Bombed Skyscraper
 Dax in Monsuno
 Shun Imagawa in Princess Comet
 Mookee in Redakai: Conquer the Kairu
 Impossible Man in Fantastic Four: World's Greatest Heroes
 Mame in A Letter to Momo
 Kai in Zambezia
 Calimero in Calimero (2014 series)
 Mikeru in Mermaid Melody Pichi Pichi Pitch
 Young Donald Duck in DuckTales (2017 TV series)
 Guillermo in Victor and Valentino
 Drew Yerface in ChalkZone

Video Games
 Abu in Hollywood Monsters
 Scott Shelby (child) in Heavy Rain
 Rusty Pete in Ratchet & Clank Future: Tools of Destruction
 Rusty Pete in Ratchet & Clank Future: Quest for Booty
 Marty in Mafia II
 Sasha in Metro 2033
 Seeing Farther in Call of Juarez: Bound in Blood
 Hugo and Additional voices in Skylanders: Spyro's Adventure
 Hugo and Additional voices in Skylanders: Giants
 Axel Blaze in Inazuma Eleven 2
 Nunu (Italian) in League of Legends

Muppet dubbed productions
 Elmo in Elmo's World (Il Mondo di Elmo)

Live action shows and movies
 David Tom and Ryan Brown in The Young and the Restless
 Max Nickerson in Guiding Light
 Nevel Papperman in iCarly
 Abed Nadir in Community
 Billy Harlan in Goosebumps
 Dwane "Excess" Wilson in USA High
 Gem in Power Rangers RPM

Work as dubbing director
 Guru Guru Town Hanamaru-kun
 Whistle!
 School Rumble:2nd Semester
 Poppets Town

References

External links
 
 

1968 births
Living people
Italian male voice actors
Italian male video game actors
Italian television presenters
Italian voice directors